Max Purcell and Luke Saville were the defending champions but only Purcell chose to defend his title, partnering Marc Polmans. Purcell withdrew before his semifinal match against Chung Yun-seong and Aleksandar Kovacevic due to injury.

Kaichi Uchida and Wu Tung-lin won the title after defeating Chung and Kovacevic 6–7(2–7), 7–5, [11–9] in the final.

Seeds

Draw

References

External links
 Main draw

Seoul Open Challenger - Doubles
2022 Doubles